Ian Gouw (born April 9, 1997) is an actor, artist, and producer from Hong Kong.

Career
At the age of eight, Gouw was cast as a lead role in the film Fu zi (also known as "After This Our Exile"), directed by Patrick Tam. Gouw modelled for DKNY Children's Clothing as well as for Disney Clothing in 2006. At age nine, Gouw went on to become the youngest actor ever to win and receive the Taipei Golden Horse Film Festival for Best Supporting Actor. Gouw also went on to become the youngest ever to win two Hong Kong Film Festival awards for his debut film Fu zi for Best New Performer, and Best Supporting actor respectively.

In the fall of 2009, Gouw also voiced the Cantonese version of Astro Boy.

Filmography

Awards

Awards won

References

External links
 

Living people
Canadian male actors of Hong Kong descent
Canadian male film actors

Hong Kong emigrants to Canada
Hong Kong male child actors
Hong Kong male film actors
Hong Kong people of Indonesian descent
21st-century Hong Kong male actors
1997 births